Allan Ramsay (13 October 171310 August 1784) was a prominent Scottish portrait-painter.

Life and career 

Ramsay was born in Edinburgh, Scotland, the eldest son of Allan Ramsay, poet and author of The Gentle Shepherd. From the age of twenty he studied in London under the Swedish painter Hans Hysing, and at the St. Martin's Lane Academy; leaving in 1736 for Rome and Naples, where he worked for three years under Francesco Solimena and Imperiali (Francesco Fernandi).

On his return in 1738 to the British Isles, he first settled in Edinburgh, attracting attention by his head of Duncan Forbes of Culloden and his full-length portrait of the Duke of Argyll, later used on Royal Bank of Scotland banknotes. He later moved to London, where he was employed by the Duke of Bridgewater.

His pleasant manners and varied culture, not less than his artistic skill, contributed to render him popular. His only serious competitor was Thomas Hudson, with whom he shared a drapery painter, Joseph Van Aken.

In 1739 he married his first wife, Anne Bayne, the daughter of Alexander Bayne of Rires (–1737), and Mary Carstairs (1695?–1759). Anne died on 4 February 1743, giving birth to their 3rd child; none of their children reached adulthood.

One of his drawing pupils was Margaret Lindsay, eldest daughter of Sir Alexander Lindsay of Evelick and Amelia Murray (granddaughter to David Murray, 5th Viscount of Stormont and sister to the naval officer John Lindsay). He later eloped with her and on 1 March 1752 they married in the Canongate Kirk, Edinburgh; her father never forgave her for marrying an artist. Ramsay already had to maintain a daughter from his previous marriage and his two surviving sisters, but told Sir Alexander that he could provide Margaret with an annual income of £100. He said it would increase ‘as my affairs increase, and I thank God, they are in a way of increasing’ and that his only motive for the marriage was ‘my love for your Daughter, who, I am sensible, is entitled to much more than ever I shall have to bestow upon her’. Three children survived from their long and happy marriage, Amelia (1755–1813), Charlotte (1758–1818?), and John (1768–1845).

Ramsay and his new wife spent 1754 to 1757 together in Italy, going to Rome, Florence, Naples and Tivoli, researching, painting and drawing old masters, antiquities and archaeological sites. He earned income painting Grand Tourists' portraits.  This and other trips to Italy involved more literary and antiquarian research than art. After their return, Ramsay in 1761 was appointed to succeed John Shackelton as Principal Painter in Ordinary to George III, beating Hudson to the post. The king commissioned so many royal portraits to be given to ambassadors and colonial governors, that Ramsay used the services of numerous assistants—of whom David Martin and Philip Reinagle are the best known.

He gave up painting in about 1770 to concentrate on literary pursuits. His health was shattered by an accidental dislocation of the right arm and his second wife's death in 1782. With unflinching pertinacity, he struggled until he had completed a likeness of the king upon which he was engaged at the time, and then started for his beloved Italy. He left a series of 50 royal portraits to be completed by his assistant Reinagle. For several years he lingered in the south, his constitution finally broken. He died at Dover on 10 August 1784.

Ramsay was a friend of Samuel Johnson's, who said of him, 'I love Ramsay. You will not find a man in whose conversation there is more instruction, more information, and more elegance, than in Ramsay's.'

Art 

Among his most satisfactory productions are some of his earlier ones, such as the full-length of the Duke of Argyll, and the numerous bust-portraits of Scottish gentlemen and their ladies which he executed before settling in London. They are full of both grace and individuality; the features show excellent draughtsmanship; and the flesh-painting is firm and sound in method, though frequently tending a little to hardness and opacity. His full-length of Lady Mary Coke is remarkable for the skill and delicacy with which the white satin drapery is managed; while the portrait of his brown-eyed second wife Margaret, in the Scottish National Gallery, is described as having a sweetness and tenderness. The portrait of his wife also shows the influence of French art, which Ramsay incorporated into his work. The large collection of his sketches in the possession of the Royal Scottish Academy and the Board of Trustees, Edinburgh also show this French elegance and soft colours.

In a documentary broadcast by the BBC in February 2014, Ramsay was shown to be the artist who painted the lost portrait of Charles Edward Stuart in 1745, completed on the verge of his invasion of England.

Paintings 

Ramsay has paintings in the collection of a few British institutions including the National Gallery in London, Sheffield, Derby Art Gallery (attributed), Glasgow Museum and Newstead Abbey.

In 2016 a portrait of Richard Mead (King George II’s physician) by Allan Ramsay was discovered by Bendor Grosvenor (using the Art UK website) as part of the British BBC4 television programme Britain's Lost Masterpieces; conservation treatment was carried out by Simon Rollo Gillespie to repair the torn canvas and remove layers of discoloured varnishes.

One of Ramsay's most famous paintings is entitled simply "Portrait of an African" and has attracted extensive attention across recent decades, both as a representation of an individual African in 18th century Britain, but also for the difficulty of identifying the sitter. A documentary featuring this painting explores the many meanings of this enigmatic images has been produced by Royal Albert Memorial Museum & Art Gallery in Exeter.

Abolitionism and paintings of Queen Charlotte 
 
According to Mario de Valdes y Cocom in 2009 on an edition of PBS Frontline, in several paintings of Queen Charlotte, Ramsay deliberately emphasised "mulatto features" which the queen supposedly inherited via descent from a 13th-century Moorish ancestor. Valdes suggests that copies of these paintings were sent to the colonies to be used by abolitionists as a de facto support for their cause.

Other historians question whether the 13th-century ancestor, referred to in various places as a 'Moor' and Berber, was black African. In any event, they contend that the connection, nine and 15 generations removed, was too distant to consider Charlotte 'black' in any cultural way, as her other ancestors were all European.

Writings 
 A Dialogue on Taste 1762 ;(Kessinger Publishing 2009) 
 Letters on the Present Disturbances in Great Britain and her American Provinces 1777 ; (Gale ECCO 2010) 
 Observations on the Riot Act 1781 ; (Gale ECCO 2010)

References

Further reading
 Macmillan, Duncan (1984), Scottish Painting: Ramsay to Raeburn, in Parker, Geoffrey (ed.), Cencrastus No. 17, Summer 1984, pp. 25 – 29,

External links 

 Works in the National Galleries of Scotland
 Nigel Warburton on the significance of two portraits of Hume and Rousseau
 Art "4" "2"-Day – Collection of Short Biographies
 Web Gallery of Art – more examples of Ramsay's work
 
Alastair Smart Archive - Research on Allan Ramsay

1713 births
1784 deaths
18th-century Scottish painters
Scottish male painters
Principal Painters in Ordinary
Scottish portrait painters
Artists from Edinburgh
People of the Scottish Enlightenment